Olga Khristoforova (born 22 April 1980) is a Russian diver. She competed in the women's 10 metre platform event at the 1996 Summer Olympics.

References

1980 births
Living people
Russian female divers
Olympic divers of Russia
Divers at the 1996 Summer Olympics
Place of birth missing (living people)
Divers at the 2002 Asian Games
Kazakhstani female divers
Asian Games competitors for Kazakhstan